The 2015 AFC Asian Cup was the 16th edition of the men's AFC Asian Cup, a quadrennial international football tournament organised by the Asian Football Confederation (AFC). It was held in Australia from 9 to 31 January 2015. The tournament was won by Australia after defeating South Korea 2–1 in extra time in the final, thereby earning the right to participate in the 2017 FIFA Confederations Cup, which was hosted by Russia. The win was Australia's first Asian title since their move from the Oceania Football Confederation (OFC) in 2006. It was also the first time a men's team has become champions of two confederations, following Australia's four OFC Nations Cup titles: 1980, 1996, 2000 and 2004; right after the Australian women's team won the 2010 AFC Women's Asian Cup.

Australia was chosen as the host on 5 January 2011, after being the sole bidder for the right to host the 2015 tournament. The matches were played in five different stadiums across five cities: Sydney, Melbourne, Brisbane, Canberra and Newcastle. It was the first time that Australia had hosted the tournament, and it was also the first time the Asian Cup had been held outside the continent of Asia. As hosts, Australia automatically qualified for the final tournament, while the remaining 15 finalists (with the exception of Japan and South Korea who qualified via their top three position in the previous Asian Cup) were decided through a qualification process, featuring 44 teams, from February 2013 to March 2014.

The final tournament was Played in two stages: the group stage and the knockout stage. In the group stage each team played three games in a group of four, with the winners and runners-up from each group advancing to the knockout stage. In the knockout stage the eight teams competed in single-elimination matches, beginning with the quarter-finals and ending with the final match of the tournament. A third-place match was also played between the two losing teams of the semi-finals (Iraq and the United Arab Emirates). This also the last time Asian Cup has a Third-place match, then it wasn't continued since the 2019 edition.

Japan were the defending champions going into the tournament, having won the previous competition in 2011. They recorded their worst finish in the Asian Cup since the 1996 edition in the United Arab Emirates, being knocked out in the quarter-finals by that team in a penalty shootout.

Host selection
Australia initially put forward its bid to host the 2015 AFC Asian Cup in 2010. As the sole bidder for the hosting rights, Australia was officially named host on 5 January 2011.

Teams

Qualification

The 2015 AFC Asian Cup qualification process determined the 16 participating teams for the tournament. In the initial scheme, ten places were determined by qualification matches, while six places were reserved for the 2015 host nation, top three finishers in the 2011 AFC Asian Cup, and the two winners of the AFC Challenge Cup. Though, as the host nation Australia also finished as runners-up in the 2011 Asian Cup, the initial six automatic qualification spots were reduced to five, with a total of 11 spots eventually determined by the qualification matches, in which 20 AFC members competed.

There were two main competitive paths to the 2015 Asian Cup. The AFC Challenge Cup acted as a qualification competition for eligible countries within the emerging and developing category of member associations. The winners of the AFC Challenge Cup competitions in 2012 and 2014 qualified automatically for the 2015 AFC Asian Cup finals. The remaining spots were available for the teams competing in the main Asian Cup preliminaries. The AFC decided that the 20 teams involved in the qualifiers would be split into five groups of four teams each. The top two teams from each group and one best third-placed team from among all the groups would qualify for the 2015 AFC Asian Cup.

Qualified teams
Out of the sixteen teams that qualified, fourteen had participated in the 2011 tournament. Oman qualified for the first time since 2007. Palestine, winners of the 2014 AFC Challenge Cup, were the only team making their first appearance in the tournament. India and Syria are the only two teams from the 2011 tournament who failed to qualify for the subsequent edition. Excluding hosts Australia, none of the other 11 members of the ASEAN Football Federation qualified, nor did any of the South Asian national teams.

Draw

The draw for the final tournament occurred at the Sydney Opera House on 26 March 2014. The draw procedure involved the 16 participating teams drawn at random into the four groups of the group stage. In preparation for this, the teams were organised into four pots based on a seeding which used the March 2014 FIFA World Rankings (rankings beside the qualified teams). The draw and seeding ensured a fair distribution of teams in the groups, with each of the four groups in the group stage made up of one team from each pot. The host nation (Australia) was automatically placed into Pot 1, with the team having been predetermined to be in Group A. In addition, at the time of the draw, the identity of the 2014 AFC Challenge Cup winners (Palestine) was not known yet, and they were automatically placed into Pot 4.

Venues

Stadiums
The five host cities for the 2015 AFC Asian Cup, Sydney, Melbourne, Brisbane, Canberra and Newcastle, were announced on 27 March 2013, with a total five stadiums to be used.

Ticketing
Tickets for the venues were sold directly by AFC via its website, or distributed by the football associations of the 16 finalists. 500,000 tickets were available for the 31 tournament matches. Over 45,000 international visitors were forecast to visit Australia during the tournament. Prices varied from $10 (for a seat behind the goals at a group match) to $150 (for a seat in the main stand at the final). In addition to individual match tickets, fans could buy packages to see all matches played at one specific venue.

Team base camps
Each team had a "team base camp" for its stay between the matches. From an initial list of 27 potential locations, the national associations chose their locations in 2014. The teams trained and resided in these locations throughout the tournament, travelling to games staged away from their bases.

Match ball

The Nike Ordem 2 was announced as the official 2015 Asian Cup match ball on 1 October 2014. The ball features the traditional colors of the tournament. The mainly white ball has a distinctive design with a mainly red graphic pattern and yellow details for better visibility. It shows the official 2015 AFC Asian Cup logo as well as a black Swoosh. The ball provided a design for real flight, accuracy and control, and features Nike Aerowtrac grooves and a micro-textured casing. Nike RaDaR (Rapid Decision and Response) technology with a unique graphic upper is also utilised in the design to see the ball faster while the three-layer synthetic upper made for optimal touch.

Match officials
On 1 January 2015, the AFC named 47 match officials for the tournament, including referees, assistant referees, fourth officials, and reserve assistant referees. Each main refereeing team (of which there were eleven) consisted of three match officials from the same country: one referee and two assistant referees. The AFC decided three match officials from New Zealand would take part in the tournament, despite the country being in the Oceania Football Confederation. Match officials based together in Sydney, during the Asian Cup, where they trained together, had technical meetings, conduct match reviews and previews, and only split when attending appointments at the five Asian Cup stadiums in Canberra, Sydney, Newcastle, Brisbane and Melbourne. Australian referee Chris Beath, who was a fourth official before the start of the tournament, was promoted for one match when Uzbek referee Valentin Kovalenko had to withdraw due to illness.

 Final referee.

Six match officials, who served as fourth officials, and eight reserve assistant referees, who served as fifth officials, were also named:

Squads

As with the 2011 tournament, each team's squad consisted of 23 players (three of whom had to be goalkeepers). Each participating national association had to confirm their final 23-player squad no later than ten days before the start of the tournament. Teams were permitted to make late replacements in the event of serious injury, at any time up to 6 hours before their first game. During a match, all remaining squad members not named in the starting team were available to be one of the three permitted substitutions (provided the player was not serving a suspension).

Group stage
The group stage of the 2015 AFC Asian Cup took place from 9–20 January 2015: each team played three games, with the winners and runners-up from each group advancing to the knockout stage. The group stage was notable for finishing without a draw. In doing so, it became the first major international football tournament since the 1930 FIFA World Cup to record a result for every group stage match. Additionally, it surpassed the record of consecutive results at a tournament – 18 – also set at the 1930 World Cup.

Group A

Group B

Group C

Group D

Knockout stage

In all matches in the knockout stage, if the score were level at the end of 90 minutes, two 15-minute periods of extra time would take place. If the score were still level after extra time, the match was decided by a penalty shoot-out.
Scores after extra time are indicated by (a.e.t.), and penalty shoot-out are indicated by (pen.).

Quarter-finals
With a 2–0 victory over Uzbekistan in extra time, South Korea set a tournament record for appearing in ten semi-finals. The host country, Australia, reached the final four for the second consecutive time after overcoming China PR by the same score. Iran were eliminated for the third consecutive time in an Asian Cup quarter-final after Iraq defeated Iran in a penalty shootout. The match had ended 3–3 after extra time, not before a sending off which reduced the Iranians to 10 men late in the first half. The United Arab Emirates eliminated reigning champions Japan through a penalty shoot-out following a 1–1 draw at the end of extra time, marking Japan's worst finish since 1996.

Semi-finals
South Korea reached their first final since 1988, after overcoming Iraq 2–0. With a 2–0 victory against the United Arab Emirates, Australia qualified for their second consecutive final out of only three appearances in the Asian Cup since moving to the Asian Football Confederation from the Oceania Football Confederation in 2006.

Third place match
This was both Iraq's and the United Arab Emirates' second appearances in a third place playoff at the AFC Asian Cup, with the teams contesting in 1976 and 1992 respectively. The United Arab Emirates won the match 3–2 and finished in third-place for the first time.

Final

South Korea entered the match looking for their third Asian Cup title, whereas Australia attempted to win their first. After a late goal by Australia in the first half and another late goal by South Korea in the second half, the match was taken into extra time. Australia eventually won the match 2–1.

Statistics

Goalscorers

Ali Mabkhout of the United Arab Emirates received the Golden Boot award for scoring five goals. In total, 85 goals were scored by 57 different players, with two of them credited as own goals.

5 goals

 Ali Mabkhout

4 goals

 Hamza Al-Dardour
 Ahmed Khalil

3 goals

 Tim Cahill
 Sun Ke
 Keisuke Honda
 Mohammad Al-Sahlawi
 Son Heung-min

2 goals

 Massimo Luongo
 James Troisi
 Sardar Azmoun
 Reza Ghoochannejhad
 Younis Mahmoud
 Ahmed Yasin
 Lee Jung-hyup
 Sardor Rashidov

1 goal

 Jason Davidson
 Mile Jedinak
 Tomi Juric
 Robbie Kruse
 Matt McKay
 Mark Milligan
 Trent Sainsbury
 Sayed Jaafar Ahmed
 Jaycee John Okwunwanne
 Sayed Saeed
 Wu Xi
 Yu Hai
 Ehsan Hajsafi
 Morteza Pouraliganji
 Masoud Shojaei
 Dhurgham Ismail
 Amjad Kalaf
 Yaser Kasim
 Waleed Salem
 Yasuhito Endō
 Shinji Kagawa
 Shinji Okazaki
 Gaku Shibasaki
 Maya Yoshida
 Yousef Al-Rawashdeh
 Hussain Fadhel
 Ryang Yong-gi
 Abdulaziz Al-Muqbali
 Jaka Ihbeisheh
 Hassan Al-Haydos
 Khalfan Ibrahim
 Nawaf Al Abed
 Naif Hazazi
 Cho Young-cheol
 Kim Young-gwon
 Nam Tae-hee
 Odil Ahmedov
 Igor Sergeev
 Vokhid Shodiev

1 own goal
 Mohamed Husain (against United Arab Emirates)
 Gao Lin (against North Korea)

Assists
4 assists

 Massimo Luongo
 Omar Abdulrahman

3 assists

 Faouzi Aaish
 Andranik Teymourian

2 assists

 Ivan Franjic
 Alaa Abdul-Zahra
 Shinji Kagawa
 Abdallah Deeb
 Cha Du-ri
 Kim Jin-su
 Amer Abdulrahman

1 assist

 Jason Davidson
 Matthew Leckie
 Trent Sainsbury
 Tomi Juric
 Gao Lin
 Zheng Zhi
 Jiang Zhipeng
 Ashkan Dejagah
 Vouria Ghafouri
 Ali Adnan
 Dhurgham Ismail
 Amjad Kalaf
 Waleed Salem
 Ahmed Yasin
 Keisuke Honda
 Takashi Inui
 Yoshinori Muto
 Hamza Al-Dardour
 Saeed Murjan
 Oday Zahran
 Abdulaziz Al Misha'an
 Mohammed Al-Siyabi
 Nawaf Al Abed
 Abdullah Al-Zori
 Ki Sung-yueng 
 Lee Jung-hyup
 Lee Keun-ho
 Server Djeparov
 Jasur Hasanov
 Timur Kapadze
 Shavkat Mullajanov

Discipline
In the final tournament, a player was suspended for the subsequent match in the competition for either getting red card or accumulating two yellow cards in two different matches. The match review panel has the ability to increase the automatic one match ban for a red card (e.g. for violent conduct). Single yellow card cautions were erased at the conclusion of the quarter-finals, and were not carried over to the semi-finals (so that a player could only be suspended for the final by getting a red card in the semi-final). The following players were or are suspended during the final tournament – for one or more games – as a result of red cards or yellow card accumulations:

Awards
Most Valuable Player
 Massimo Luongo
Top Goalscorer
 Ali Mabkhout
Best Goalkeeper
 Mathew Ryan
Fair Play Award

Team of the tournament
According to the official Twitter of the AFC Asian Cup organization committee, four players from both the winning Australian team and the runner-up Korean team were selected in the team of the tournament while all other players included were from a team which progressed to the semi-finals.

Final standings

|-
| colspan="11"| Eliminated in the quarter-finals
|-

|-
| colspan="11"| Eliminated in group stage
|-

|}

Records
The 2015 Asian Cup achieved 26 consecutive matches without a draw, the most of any major football tournament, breaking the previous record of 18 set at the 1930 FIFA World Cup in Uruguay.

Ali Mabkhout broke the record for fastest goal at the AFC Asian Cup, scoring after just 14 seconds for the United Arab Emirates against Bahrain in their group stage match.

Palestine made its first ever appearance in the Asian Cup, and Jaka Ihbeisheh scored the nation's first ever goal in an Asian Cup in their second group match against Jordan. This goal also marked for the first time a Slovene scored in an Asian Cup game, as Jaka's being Slovenian descent.

With the title, Australia became the first men's national team to win titles in two different confederations, having won the OFC Nations Cup four times before moving to the AFC. Tim Cahill and Mark Bresciano became the first men's players to win two different confederation titles, having previously won the 2004 OFC Nations Cup. By winning the Asian Cup, Australia also became the first country to simultaneously hold the AFC Asian Cup and AFC Champions League titles, following the triumph of Western Sydney Wanderers in the 2014 AFC Champions League.

Marketing

Trophy tour

The Trophy Tour commenced in China in September 2014, it then travelled to Qatar, United Arab Emirates, South Korea and Japan before arriving in Australia in December, where the trophy made it to all five 2015 AFC Asian Cup host cities.

Opening ceremony

The opening ceremony of the 2015 AFC Asian Cup took place on 9 January, at the Melbourne Rectangular Stadium, before the opening match of the tournament between hosts Australia and Kuwait. The ceremony was produced by a consortium of sport event specialists Twenty3 Sports + Entertainment and creative technology firm Spinifex Group. The consortium has worked on the main international sporting events including the 2010 Winter Olympics and the 2008 Summer Olympics opening ceremony. The opening ceremony for the Asian Cup directed by Peter Nielson with Musical Direction by Chong Lim, and featured performances by Australian DJ, singer and dancer Havana Brown, Australian indie pop band Sheppard, Indigenous Australian musician Geoffrey Gurrumul Yunupingu, and Australian hip-hop artists L-Fresh The Lion, Joelistics and Mistress of Ceremony. It also featured 80 children from local junior football clubs and a performing cast of more than 120 Australian dancers, acrobats, Indigenous performers and football freestylers.

Logo and mascot

The official logo for the tournament was unveiled at a special event in Melbourne, in October 2012. Designed by Sydney agency, WiteKite. The logo depicts a stylised player, kicking a football from the east coast of Australia across country towards Asia. The ball also represents the Australian summer sun arcing west from Australia to Asia. The four golden bands forming the map of Australia represent the four host cities. The design is embraced by the AFC holding device.

The mascot of the tournament, "Nutmeg the Wombat", was unveiled at the Wild Life Sydney Zoo, on 11 November 2014. The mascot, a wombat native to Australia, wore the colours of the 2015 AFC Asian Cup, red and yellow. It was named after the football trick where a player dribbles the ball through an opponent's legs, known as a nutmeg.

Song
Theme song was Warrior by Havana Brown.

Sponsorship
AFC announced ten official sponsors and six official supporters as shown below.

Broadcasting
The tournament was broadcast live by around 80 TV channels covering the whole world. 800 million people were expected to watch matches, with the tournament reaching a potential TV audience of more than 2.5 billion people. Below is the list of confirmed broadcasting right holders for 2015 AFC Asian Cup.

Controversies
Due to a hostage taking in Sydney in December 2014, security was increased for all team bases and stadiums, in addition to police escorts for all official activities.

During a doping test, Jordan's Ahmad Hayel was required to drink so much water to produce a urine sample, that he developed hypothermia and was rendered unconscious. Jordan coach Ray Wilkins was infuriated at Asian Cup officials over the procedure.

On 24 January 2015, following the country's elimination from the tournament, it was revealed that the Iranian Football Federation (FFIRI) had lodged a formal complaint to FIFA against their quarter-final opponent. The complaint was regarding the eligibility of Iraqi midfielder Alaa Abdul-Zahra, with the FFIRI arguing that the player should not have been allowed to play due to him submitting a positive doping test while playing for an Iranian club side in 2014. According to documents seen by Agence France-Presse, the 27-year-old tested positive for the banned stimulant methylhexanamine, in results that were verified by a WADA-approved laboratory in Cologne. In an email exchange dated September 2014, FIFA promised to take action, but there is no record of a suspension for Abdul-Zahra. The Iranian national team remained in Australia whilst awaiting a response from FIFA and a final decision by the AFC disciplinary committee. On 25 January, the AFC disciplinary committee decided that the FFIRI protest was unfounded, and, therefore, dismissed the case, with Iraq, cleared to take its place in their semi-final match against South Korea the following day.

On 29 January 2015, after the defeat of Iraq and the United Arab Emirates during the 2015 AFC Asian Cup, West Asian Football Federation members reportedly sought to remove Australia from the AFC primarily due to "Australia benefiting hugely from Asian involvement without giving much in return", the resentment grew in the aftermath of Australia's conquest of the tournament.

Notes

References

External links 

  
 AFC Asian Cup on The-AFC.com

 
2015
AFC Asian Cup
AFC Asian Cup
2015 AFC Asian Cup
January 2015 sports events in Australia